Lernahovit (also Romanized as Lernovit, Lerrnhovit, and Lernhovit; formerly, Sisavan and Karakilisa) is a town in the Lori Province of Armenia.

References

World Gazeteer: Armenia – World-Gazetteer.com

Populated places in Lori Province